Ivan Francesco De Santis (born 21 May 1997) is an Italian professional football defender who plays for  club Monopoli. A centre-back, he made his professional debut on 2 November 2016, for Catania.

Career

Early career
De Santis was born in the Apulian town of Conversano, but began his career in Lombardy in the youth teams of Serie A giants Milan. His progression through the youth teams was rapid, and he became a starter for the Primavera side aged just 16. Despite playing against opponents often two years older than himself, De Santis impressed coaches whilst playing in the Campionato Nazionale Primavera and UEFA Youth League, and made over 60 appearances for the Primavera side in total.

Loan moves
De Santis was sent on loan to Lega Pro side Catania at the beginning of the 2016–17 season. Here, however, De Santis received little game time and made just three appearances. Due to this lack of playing time, Milan recalled De Santis early, in January 2017, in order to loan him out again. He signed a six-month loan contract with Paganese, also of Lega Pro, on 27 January 2017.

Ascoli
On 8 January 2019, he joined Virtus Entella on loan with an option to purchase.

Virtus Entella
He moved to Virtus permanently on 23 August 2019.

Loan to Cesena
On 20 January 2020, he joined Serie C club Cesena on loan until the end of the season.

Loan to Modena
On 14 January 2021, he was loaned to Serie C club Modena.

Loan to Monopoli
On 31 August 2021 he moved to Monopoli on loan with an obligation to buy.

Loan to Paganese
On 28 January 2022, he joined Paganese on a sub-loan from Monopoli.

National team
De Santis has played for every age category for Italy from under-15 to under-19, and also received a call-up to the under-20 side in September 2016 for the Under-20 Four Nations Tournament, after Fabio Della Giovanna was forced to withdraw due to injury.

Career statistics

Club
Updated 1 January 2018

References

1997 births
Sportspeople from the Metropolitan City of Bari
Footballers from Apulia
Living people
Italian footballers
Association football defenders
Italy youth international footballers
A.C. Milan players
Catania S.S.D. players
Paganese Calcio 1926 players
Ascoli Calcio 1898 F.C. players
Virtus Entella players
Cesena F.C. players
Modena F.C. players
S.S. Monopoli 1966 players
Serie B players
Serie C players